Michael Volle (born 1960) is a German operatic baritone. After engagements at several German and Swiss opera houses, he has worked freelance since 2011. While he first appeared in Mozart roles such as Guglielmo, Papageno and Don Giovanni, he moved on to title roles such as Verdi's Falstaff, Tchaikovsky's Eugene Onegin and Alban Berg's Wozzeck. He has performed at major opera houses in Europe and the Metropolitan Opera, in roles including Mandryka in Arabella and Hans Sachs in Die Meistersinger von Nürnberg. His awards include Singer of the Year by Opernwelt and Der Faust.

Life 
Volle was born in Freudenstadt in the Black Forest in 1960, the son of a Protestant pastor and the youngest of eight siblings. His brothers are the actor  and the opera singer Dietrich Volle. He was first engaged at the Nationaltheater Mannheim in 1990, where leading roles included Guglielmo in Mozart's Così fan tutte and Papageno in Die Zauberflöte, Wolfram in Wagner's Tannhäuser, and Albert in Massenet's Werther. He belonged to the ensemble of the Bonn Opera from 1994, where he appeared as Mozart's Don Giovanni, Silvio in Leoncavallo's Pagliacci, and the Count in Lortzing's Der Wildschütz. He was engaged by the Deutsche Oper am Rhein from 1996, and by the Cologne Opera from 1998, where he appeared as Marcello in Puccini's La Bohème and as Ford in Verdi's Falstaff. He was a member of the ensemble of the Opernhaus Zürich from 1999 to 2007. He then moved to the Bavarian State Opera in Munich, where he appeared as Alfonso in Così fan tutte, Amfortas in Wagner's Parsifal, and in the title roles of Tchaikovsky's Eugen Onegin and Alban Berg's Wozzeck, among others. For his portrayal of Wozzeck, he was awarded the theatre prize Der Faust in 2009. Since 2011, he has worked freelance.

Volle appeared as a guest at major German and European opera houses, as Heerrufer in Wagner's Lohengrin at the Opéra National de Paris in 1996, as the Speaker in Mozart's Zauberflöte at La Scala in 1998, at the Royal Opera House Covent Garden, the Deutsche Oper Berlin, and La Monnaie in Brussels, among others. At the Vienna State Opera, he appeared in the title role of Wagner's Der fliegende Holländer, Count Almaviva in Mozart's Le nozze di Figaro, and as Don Giovanni, Scarpia and Amfortas.

Volle also appeared at the Salzburg Festival as Tamare in Schreker's Die Gezeichneten, in the double role of Dr. Schön and Jack the Ripper in Berg's Lulu, and in 2013 as Hans Sachs in Wagner's Die Meistersinger von Nürnberg. In 2007 he made his debut at the Bayreuth Festival as Sixtus Beckmesser in Die Meistersinger von Nürnberg. He was Hans Sachs there in the highly acclaimed production of the work in 2017, directed by Barrie Kosky. In 2018, he first sang the title role of Verdi's Falstaff at the Staatsoper Berlin, conducted by Daniel Barenboim. He made his first appearance at the Metropolitan Opera as Mandryka in Arabella by Richard Strauss, followed by performances as Hans Sachs there.

Volle lives in Berlin; he is in his second marriage, to the Swiss opera singer Gabriela Scherer.

Awards 
 2008: Singer of the Year, by Opernwelt
 2008:  of Münchner Merkur
 2009: Der Faust

 2014: nominated for the International Opera Awards in the category Best Singer

Discography 
CD
 Zemlinsky: Der Traumgörge. EMI
 Schubert: Winterreise. Animato
 Schubert: Schwanengesang. Naxos
 Bach: St Matthew Passion. EMI
 Songs by Great Conductors. Oehms

DVD
 Schreker: Die Gezeichneten. Euroarts
 Bellini: Beatrice di Tenda. TDK
 Weber: Der Freischütz. Constantin Film 2010
 Wagner: Die Meistersinger von Nürnberg. EMI
 Puccini: La Bohème. EMI
 Wagner: Parsifal. Deutsche Grammophon
 Debussy: Pelléas et Mélisande. TDK
 Schubert: Fierrabras. EMI
 Richard Strauss: Salome. Opus Arte
 Richard Strauss: Ariadne auf Naxos. TDK

Notes

References

External links 
 
 Michael Volle (agency, in German) lifepr.de
 Wissen, worauf es ankommt (interview, in German] in Münchner Merkur, October 2008, retrieved 17 February 2020
 
 
 

German operatic baritones
20th-century German  male opera singers
21st-century German  male opera singers
1960 births
Living people
People from Freudenstadt